Cranidium is an monotypic genus of stick insects in the monotypic tribe Cranidiini.  The single species Cranidium gibbosum has been recorded from northern Brazil, French Guiana and Surinam.

References

External Links

Phasmatodea genera
Monotypic insect genera
Phasmatodea of South America